The Great Northern Railway class C2 locomotives were a class of 4-4-2 tank locomotives built by the Great Northern Railway (GNR) between 1898 and 1907. They were used on local and commuter passenger trains in Yorkshire and North London. They were withdrawn between 1957 and 1958.

Numbering
The GNR numbered them 1009A, 1010, 1013–1020 and 1501–1550. All passed to the London and North Eastern Railway in 1923, who renumbered them by adding 3000 to their GNR number.

In the post World War II renumbering scheme, the remaining 50 locomotives were renumbered 7350–7399.

In 1948, the remaining 49 locomotives passed to British Railways, who renumbered them by prefixing a 6 to their LNER number (i.e. 67350–67399).

References

External links
 LNER Encyclopedia entry for LNER class C12 (GNR class C2)

C2
Railway locomotives introduced in 1898
Standard gauge steam locomotives of Great Britain
Scrapped locomotives
4-4-2T locomotives

Passenger locomotives